The fourth season of Blue Bloods, a police procedural drama series created by Robin Green and Mitchell Burgess, premiered on CBS September 27, 2013. Leonard Goldberg serves as executive producer.

According to TV by the Numbers, CBS was all but guaranteed to commit to a fourth season.  This is because as a CBS Television Studios production, CBS has a financial incentive to produce at least the minimum number of episodes needed for stripped syndication. On March 27, 2013, CBS made it official by renewing Blue Bloods for a fourth season.

Cast 
Donnie Wahlberg, Bridget Moynahan, Will Estes and Len Cariou are first credited, with Tom Selleck receiving an "and" billing at the close of the main title sequence. Amy Carlson and Sami Gayle are once again credited as "also starring" within the episodes they appear. Jennifer Esposito, who had entered a dispute with CBS during season 3 production regarding doctor's orders for her to cut back working hours because of her Coeliac disease, was not brought back for season 4 as Danny’s partner Jackie Curatola. Marisa Ramirez, who appeared in the final seven episodes of season 3 as Danny's partner Det. Maria Baez, was retained as a full-time cast member for season 4, and she receives an "also starring" billing.

Vanessa Ray appears this season as Jamie’s partner Edit "Eddie" Janko, replacing Sebastian Sozzi, whose character Vinny Cruz was killed off near the end of season 3.  Though the actress appears regularly, she receives a "special guest star" billing. Also appearing regularly and receiving "special guest star" billing are Gregory Jbara as Deputy Commissioner of Public Information Garrett Moore, and John Ventimiglia as Chief of Department Dino Arbogast.

Main cast 
Tom Selleck as Police Commissioner Francis "Frank" Reagan
Donnie Wahlberg as Detective 1st Grade Daniel "Danny" Reagan
Bridget Moynahan as ADA Erin Reagan
Will Estes as Officer Jamison "Jamie" Reagan
Len Cariou as Henry Reagan
Amy Carlson as Linda Reagan 
Sami Gayle as Nicole "Nicky" Reagan-Boyle

Recurring cast 

Marisa Ramirez as Detective 1st Grade Maria Baez
Abigail Hawk as Detective 1st Grade Abigail Baker
Vanessa Ray as Officer Edit "Eddie" Janko
Gregory Jbara as Deputy Commissioner of Public Information Garrett Moore
John Ventimiglia as Chief of Department Dino Arbogast
Robert Clohessy as Sergeant Sidney "Sid" Gormley
Nicholas Turturro as Sargeant Anthony Renzulli  
Peter Hermann as Jack Boyle  
Bebe Neuwirth as Kelly Peterson  
Ato Essandoh as Reverend Darnell Potter 
Tony Terraciano as Jack Reagan 
Andrew Terraciano as Sean Regan

Episodes

Ratings

References

External links

2013 American television seasons
2014 American television seasons
Blue Bloods (TV series)